Simone Elkeles (born April 24, 1970) is an American author known for the teen romance Perfect Chemistry trilogy and How To Ruin trilogy. She is a New York Times Bestselling young adult author. Simone has won the 2010 RITA Award for Best Young Adult Romance from the Romance Writers of America for her book Perfect Chemistry. The sequel to Perfect Chemistry, Rules of Attraction, appeared on USA Today Best Sellers List and The New York Times Best Sellers List.

Early years
Simone Elkeles was born in Chicago, Illinois, on April 24, 1970. Her family later moved to Glenview, Illinois, up until her freshman year of high school, when they moved to Deerfield, Illinois, a suburb of Chicago. She attended Deerfield High School and graduated in 1988. She then attended Purdue University, but graduated from the University of Illinois, earning a Bachelor of Science in psychology. She later earned her Master of Science degree in industrial relations from Loyola University-Chicago. While working for manufacturing company creating diversity programs for their employees, she continued her education at Loyola University-Chicago, where she received her Master of Science degree in industrial relations. After finishing her education she went to work at her father's manufacturing company. When he died, she—at 24 years old—became the CEO. She learned about marketing and about business, instead of teaching her about writing. She has one son and one daughter. In 2014, Elkeles was divorced from her husband.

Author
Simone starting writing in 2000, but she did not sign right away. After she completed How to Ruin a Summer Vacation, Elkeles began sending her book to agents. After 5 years of searching, Elkeles finally found an agent, Nadia Cornier, who loved How to Ruin a Summer Vacation and would be willing to sign her. Her agent sold Simone's first three books before Elkeles split from her agent and found her current agent, Kristin Nelson, who was able to take Simone to “the next level”. She has since won many awards and recognition for her works, including being named Author of the Year by the Illinois Association of Teachers of English.

Works

Simone Elkeles currently has 10 works of young adult fiction.

How to Ruin Trilogy

How to Ruin a Summer Vacation (2006)
How to Ruin My Teenage Life (2007)
How to Ruin Your Boyfriend's Reputation (2009)
Ruined (2010) (How to Ruin Trilogy: #1-3)

Leaving Paradise/ Return to Paradise

Leaving Paradise (2007)
Return to Paradise (2010)

Perfect Chemistry Trilogy

Perfect Chemistry (2008)
Rules of Attraction (2010)
Chain Reaction (2011)

 Wild cards/crush

 Wild Cards (2013)
 Wild Crush (2015)

Standalone novels 

 Crossing the Line (2018)
 American Princess Warrior (2022)

Reception
Perfect Chemistry received mixed to generally positive reviews. RT Book Reviews gave it 4 stars stating,
      
Kirkus reviews says of Perfect Chemistry,
              

For Leaving Paradise RT Book Reviews nominated it 2010 Young Adult novel and gives it a Top Pick rating of 4 stars saying,

Awards and recognition
2008 Author of the Year by the IL Association of Teachers of English
2010 RITA Award for Best Young Adult Romance for Perfect Chemistry
New York Times Best Seller List for Rules of Attraction and Return to Paradise
USA Today Best Sellers List

References

External links
Simone Elkeles's Official Website
Perfect Chemistry Series Official Website

Living people
1970 births
Writers from Chicago
Purdue University alumni
University of Illinois alumni
Loyola University Chicago alumni
21st-century American novelists
American women novelists
21st-century American women writers
RITA Award winners
Women romantic fiction writers
Novelists from Illinois